Carol Flynn (born August 7, 1933) is an American politician who served in the Minnesota Senate from 1990 to 2001.

References

1933 births
Living people
Democratic Party Minnesota state senators
Women state legislators in Minnesota